A transfer station, or resource recovery centre, is a building or processing site for the temporary deposition, consolidation and aggregation of waste.

Transfer stations vary significantly in size and function. Some transfer stations allow residents and businesses to drop off small loads of waste and recycling, and may perform some preliminary sorting of material. Other transfer stations are places where local waste collection vehicles will deposit their waste cargo prior to aggregation and loading into larger vehicles. These larger vehicles will transport the waste to the end point of disposal in an incinerator, landfill, or hazardous waste facility, or for recycling.

Transfer stations can be publicly or privately owned. They vary in size, from small regional site managing less than 1000 tonnes/year to large sites managing over 200,000 tonne/year.

See also

List of solid waste treatment technologies
Mechanical biological treatment
Solid Waste Association of North America
Types of transfer stations-RD

References

Waste collection
Waste management